Sir Harry Deeley Mallaby-Deeley, 1st Baronet (27 October 1863, London – 4 February 1937, Cannes) was a British Conservative Party politician.

Harry Deeley was educated at Shrewsbury School and Trinity College, Cambridge.  His brother was the theatrical producer Frank Curzon.

He was the founder and first President of Prince's Golf Club at Mitcham. With his Cambridge University friend Percy Montagu Lucas he provided most of the capital to create new links at Sandwich, now Prince's Golf Club, Sandwich, the land being donated by the Earl of Guilford. The course was designed by Charles Hutchings, the 1902 Amateur Champion, and laid out between 1904 and 1906.

In 1913 he purchased the whole of the Duke of Bedford's Covent Garden estate for £2m., having already been involved in the purchase of the Piccadilly Hotel and St. James's Court, Buckingham Gate.

In 1922 he famously acquired control of the large estates of the cash-strapped Duke of Leinster during the latter's lifetime. Fitzgerald had previously sold Mallaby-Deeley his reversionary rights to the estate for a notional consideration, not expecting, as a younger son, to inherit.

Deeley was elected Member of Parliament for Harrow in 1910 and for Willesden East in 1918, resigning in 1923. In 1922 he assumed the additional name of Mallaby, his mother's maiden name, by deed poll and was created a baronet (of Micham Court, Surrey).

References

External links 
 

1863 births
1937 deaths
Baronets in the Baronetage of the United Kingdom
Conservative Party (UK) MPs for English constituencies
UK MPs 1910
UK MPs 1910–1918
UK MPs 1918–1922
UK MPs 1922–1923
People educated at Shrewsbury School